Lotte Lore is a 1921 German historical film directed by Franz Eckstein and starring Erna Morena, Alfred Abel, and Margarete Schlegel.

Cast
In alphabetical order

References

Bibliography

External links

1921 films
Films of the Weimar Republic
Films directed by Franz Eckstein
German silent feature films
German black-and-white films
National Film films
1920s historical films
German historical films
1920s German films